Yancho Ivanov Andreev (born 8 January 1990) is a Bulgarian football player who plays as a midfielder for Dobrudzha.

References

External links
Player profile at TFF

Living people
1990 births
Bulgarian footballers
Association football defenders
PFC Cherno More Varna players
FC Chernomorets Balchik players
PFC Kaliakra Kavarna players
PFC Minyor Pernik players
FC Vitosha Bistritsa players
FC Oborishte players
FC Lokomotiv 1929 Sofia players
PFC Dobrudzha Dobrich players
PFC Spartak Varna players
First Professional Football League (Bulgaria) players

Association football midfielders
People from Dobrich